Joaquim Martins Ferreira do Amaral (born 13 April 1945) is a Portuguese former politician of the Social Democratic Party (PSD).

He was a candidate in the 2001 Portuguese presidential election, taking just under 35% of the vote and losing to incumbent Jorge Sampaio.

He served in the Assembly of the Republic from the seventh to ninth legislatures (1995–2009), first for the Lisbon District, then the Leiria District.

As the Minister for Public Works, Transport and Communications he oversaw the construction of the Vasco da Gama Bridge. He later served as the president of Lusoponte, the company that built it.

Honours

Portugal
Grand Cross of the Order of Prince Henry (30 January 2006)

Other countries
 Grand Cross of the Order of Orange-Nassau (27 September 1991)
 Grand Cross of the Order of the Southern Cross (25 July 1996)

References

1945 births
Living people
Candidates for President of Portugal
Grand Crosses of the Order of Prince Henry
Knights Grand Cross of the Order of Orange-Nassau
Members of the Assembly of the Republic (Portugal)
People from Lisbon
Portuguese people of Italian descent
Social Democratic Party (Portugal) politicians